The 2014 JSM Challenger of Champaign–Urbana was a professional tennis tournament played on hard courts. It was the nineteenth edition of the tournament which is part of the 2014 ATP Challenger Tour. It took place in Champaign, Illinois, United States between November 10 and November 16, 2014.

Singles main-draw entrants

Seeds

 1 Rankings are as of November 3, 2014.

Other entrants
The following players received wildcards into the singles main draw:
  Marcos Giron
  Farris Fathi Gosea
  Jared Hiltzik
  Peter Kobelt

The following players received entry from the qualifying draw:
  Marek Michalička
  Frederik Nielsen
  Noah Rubin
  Fritz Wolmarans

The following player received entry by an alternate spot:
  Dimitar Kutrovsky

Champions

Singles

  Adrian Mannarino def.  Frederik Nielsen, 6–2, 6–2

Doubles

  Ross William Guignon /  Tim Kopinski def.  Frank Dancevic /  Adil Shamasdin, 7–6(7–2), 6–2

External links
Official Website

JSM Challenger of Champaign-Urbana
JSM Challenger of Champaign–Urbana
JSM Challenger of Champaign-Urbana
Depaul Illinois
JSM Challenger of Champaign-Urbana